Pustike ( or ) is a dispersed settlement in the Municipality of Šmarje pri Jelšah in eastern Slovenia. It lies in the hills northeast of Zibika. The area is part of the historical Styria region and is now included in the Savinja Statistical Region.

References

External links
Pustike at Geopedia

Populated places in the Municipality of Šmarje pri Jelšah